Isatu Fofanah can refer to:

 Isatu Fofanah (athlete) (born 1993), a Canadian athlete
 Isatu Fofanah (politician) (born 1958), a Sierra Leonean politician